Ivar Asbjørn Følling (23 August 1888 – 24 January 1973) was a Norwegian physician and biochemist. He first described the disease commonly known as Følling's disease or phenylketonuria (PKU).

Career
He was born at Kvam, Steinkjer  in Trøndelag, Norway. Følling studied chemistry at the Norwegian Institute of Technology in Trondheim and graduated in 1916. He then went to the University of Kristiania (now  University of Oslo), graduating in medicine in 1922. 
He received his cand.med.  in 1929 after doing postgraduate work in Norway and abroad in Denmark, England, Vienna and the U.S. Starting in 1932, Følling occupied a series of medical posts in Oslo, culminating in his being Professor of Biochemistry and Physician-in-Chief at the central laboratory at the Norwegian national research hospital Oslo University Hospital. Følling was a professor of biochemistry at the University of Oslo for more than 30 years. He retired in 1958.

Discovery
In 1934 at Oslo University Hospital, Følling saw a young woman named Borgny Egeland. She had two children, Liv and Dag, who had been normal at birth but subsequently developed mental retardation. When Dag was about a year old, the mother noticed a strong smell to his urine. Følling obtained urine samples from the children and, after many tests, he found that the substance causing the odor in the urine was phenylpyruvic acid. The children, he concluded, had excess phenylpyruvic acid in the urine, the condition which came to be called phenylketonuria (PKU).
This abnormal condition reflects an inability to break down the amino acid phenylalanine due to an hereditary deficiency of the necessary enzyme which is called phenylalanine hydroxylase.

Perspective
Føllings discovery provided the basis for the so-called metabolic screening of newborns. Today a screening blood test for PKU is done on newborns to detect the disease. With a special diet low in phenylalanine, PKU newborns can grow and develop into normal children and adults. Følling's work was too late to save Liv and Dag from severe progressive mental retardation (and in Dag's case, death) but it has saved thousands of children since then. It has been said that: "Følling is by many considered the most important medical scientist not to receive the Nobel Prize for Physiology or Medicine".

Honors
Fridtjof Nansen Prize for Outstanding Research -1949
Knight 1st Grade of Order of St. Olav - 1958 
Anders Jahre Award for Medical Research- 1960
Joseph P. Kennedy Jr., Foundation Awards - 1962
Gunnerus Medal - 1966

References

External links
Great Norwegians (In Norwegian)
The first evidence of links between brain development and metabolism.

1888 births
1973 deaths
People from Steinkjer
Norwegian Institute of Technology alumni
University of Oslo alumni
Academic staff of the University of Oslo
Oslo University Hospital people
Norwegian biochemists
Norwegian geneticists
Recipients of the St. Olav's Medal

20th-century Norwegian physicians
Members of the Royal Swedish Academy of Sciences